Bardoli Lok Sabha constituency is in Gujarat, a state in western India. This constituency was created in 2008 as a part of the implementation of delimitation of parliamentary constituencies. The seat is reserved for Scheduled Tribes. It first held elections in 2009 and its first member of parliament (MP) was Tushar Amarsinh Chaudhary of the Indian National Congress. As of the latest elections in 2014, Parbhubhai Vasava of the Bharatiya Janata Party represents this constituency.

Vidhan Sabha segments
As of 2014, Bardoli Lok Sabha constituency comprises seven Vidhan Sabha (legislative assembly) segments. These are:

Members of Lok Sabha

Election results

2019 Indian general election in Gujarat

General election 2014

General election 2009

References

See also
 Mandvi Lok Sabha constituency

Lok Sabha constituencies in Gujarat
Surat district
Tapi district
Constituencies established in 2008